McNeil may refer to:

 McNeil, Arkansas
 McNeil, Caldwell County, Texas
 McNeil, Travis County, Texas
 McNeil Consumer Healthcare, a division of Johnson & Johnson, distributor of Tylenol
 McNeil High School, high school in Austin, Texas
 McNeil Island, Washington
 McNeil River, Alaska
 McNeil's Nebula
 Mount McNeil, a mountain in Yukon Territory, Canada
 Ortho-McNeil Pharmaceutical, American pharmaceutical manufacturer

See also 
McNeil (surname)
McNeill (disambiguation)
MacNeill
McNeal
MacNeal
MacNeille